Sam A. Baker State Park is a public recreation area encompassing  in the Saint Francois Mountains region of the Missouri Ozarks. The state park offers fishing, canoeing, swimming, camping, and trails for hiking and horseback riding. The visitor and nature center is housed in a historic building that was originally constructed as a stable in 1934.

History
The state park was acquired in 1926 and is named for Missouri governor Sam Aaron Baker who encouraged the development of the park in his home county. In the 1930s, the Civilian Conservation Corps added many structures to the park including the park office and visitors center, which was originally used as a stable, the stone dining lodge, most of the park's cabins, and the backpacking shelters on the Mudlick Trail. Twenty-five buildings and five structures comprise the Sam A. Baker State Park Historic District, a national historic district listed on the National Register of Historic Places in 1985.

Activities and amenities
The park offers access to the St. Francis River and Big Creek for fishing, canoeing, and swimming. 
Camping: The park has 187 campsites, half of them electric and 18 rustic, plus air-conditioned cabins. A separate campground with 21 sites is available for use by equestrians.
Trails: The  Mudlick Trail is available for hiking, backpacking, and horseback riding. The Mudlick has three stone shelters available for backpackers, and views of the  Mudlick Mountain Wild Area and the  Mudlick Natural Area. There is also the  Shut-Ins Trail, the Hollow Pass Trail, and the nearby Wappapello Section of the Ozark Trail. The park also has a  paved bicycle trail open to cyclists, hikers, skateboarders, and roller skaters.

Access
Missouri Route 143 passes through the park. From the west access is via Route 143 from DesArc in southern Iron County. Access from the east and US Route 67 is via Missouri Route 34 north of Silva to the Route 143 junction east of Patterson.

References

External links

Sam A. Baker State Park Missouri Department of Natural Resources
Sam A. Baker State Park Map Missouri Department of Natural Resources

State parks of Missouri
State parks of the U.S. Interior Highlands
Protected areas established in 1926
1926 establishments in Missouri
Civilian Conservation Corps in Missouri
Protected areas of Wayne County, Missouri
Nature centers in Missouri
Historic districts on the National Register of Historic Places in Missouri
Buildings and structures in Wayne County, Missouri
National Register of Historic Places in Wayne County, Missouri
National Park Service rustic in Missouri